The Arthur Terry School is a secondary school and sixth form with academy status in the Four Oaks area of Sutton Coldfield, England. It is Ofsted Good and was an Arts College before the Specialist Schools initiative was made defunct. The school's headteacher is Samantha Kibble. It is part of the Arthur Terry Learning Partnership.

Admissions
It is situated south of the Butlers Lane railway station, between Four Oaks and Mere Green. It is north of the B4151, which is between the A454 and A5127. This school focuses on performing arts.

History

Bi-lateral school
The school was built in 1963 (opening on 10 September) and was named after Arthur Terry, who was the Mayor of Sutton Coldfield from 1934 to 1935. It was sometimes known as the Arthur Terry Grammar/High School, with around 950 boys and girls. Boys were required to wear bow ties, with a light shade of bronze; this was the idea of the head master, Mr Dennis Lindley. The uniform was initially popular. Knitted nylon conventional ties were equally allowed, and eventually replaced the bow tie due to their greater popularity with wearers.

It was run by Warwickshire Education Committee, specifically the excepted district of the Borough of Sutton Coldfield. It was a bilateral school with a grammar stream, similar to a grammar school. From April 1974 it was administered by Birmingham City Council.

Comprehensive
In March 1999, BBC Radio 4's Music Machine programme came from the school, interviewing the clarinettist Emma Johnson.

The school underwent a £15 million rebuilding program, designed by architects Watkins Gray International (www.wgi.co.uk), that saw most of the original school demolished to make way for the new buildings; only the Sports Hall, Drama Studio and Sixth Form Centre have remained.

Academy
The school became an academy in August 2012, and is no longer under LA control, However the school continues to co-ordinate admission with Birmingham LA.

Activities
The school is also well known for its shows each year, including Grease, Les Misérables and Godspell. The school's most recent production was of We Will Rock You, which sold out to 10 full houses spread over two weeks.

The school implemented a vertical tutoring system at the start of the 2007/8 school year. Every tutor group now has a mix of 2–7 students from each Year Group.

The school also has its own student-run radio station, named ATRfm which broadcasts internally.

The school has been criticised, amongst several other British schools, for making use of the Brain Gym 'mental exercise' programme, which claims that 'the brain is a muscle' and that a set of hand and leg movements and chest rubs can promote learning. Commonly described as pseudoscience, physician Ben Goldacre has described the programme as 'ludicrous' while Teacher of the Year award-winner Philip Beadle described it as 'moonshine...you'd probably get as much benefit from taking a Brain Gym book and booting it around the room'.

The Arthur Terry School used to be the home of one of the best junior Ultimate Frisbee teams in the country, Arctic Ultimate. The team consistently finished in the top 3 in national junior tournaments with a large volume of students making the Great Britain squad for under 17s, under 20s, under 23s and open. Arctic Ultimate alumni are still playing today at universities and clubs across the country.

Headteacher
The former Headteacher Sir Christopher Stone was knighted for his outstanding contribution to system leadership nationally. Chris stepped down in 2011 to take up a position of CEO for the Arthur Terry Learning Partnership: the multi academy trust which currently over sees 7 schools in Birmingham and Warwickshire. Previous to Sam Kibble taking on the role of Associate Headteacher; the school was led by two joint Headteachers, Richard Gill and Neil Warner. Richard and Neil were made NLEs in September 2015 recognising the impact they have had in supporting other school communities as well as raising standards further at Arthur Terry. Richard was appointed as CEO of the Arthur Terry Learning Partnership. Neil led the Arthur Terry School for one year as Headteacher as well as being the senior lead for secondary schools within the ATLP.

Academic performance
Arthur Terry is consistently the highest performing comprehensive school in Birmingham according to DfE league tables for KS4 and is in the top 10% nationally for mixed community comprehensive schools.

In 2012 it was chosen to become one of the first  National Teaching Schools.

Notable alumni

Duncan Gibbins, TV  Presenter and film Director. Was a pupil at the school from the day it opened, living on Kittoe Road.
James and Oliver Phelps, actors portraying Fred and George Weasley in the eight film adaptations of the Harry Potter series, by J.K Rowling

References

External links
 EduBase
 The Arthur Terry School

Sutton Coldfield
Secondary schools in Birmingham, West Midlands
Educational institutions established in 1963
Academies in Birmingham, West Midlands
1963 establishments in England